Giovanni Andrea Biscaino was an Italian painter of the Baroque period, described by the Grove Dictionary of Art as a "mediocre landscape painter". He was born in Genoa. He was the father and teacher of the painter, etcher and draughtsman Bartolomeo Biscaino. He died at Genoa of the plague in 1657.

Sources

1657 deaths
17th-century Genoese people
17th-century Italian painters
17th-century deaths from plague (disease)
Italian male painters
Painters from Genoa
Italian Baroque painters
Year of birth unknown
Italian landscape painters